Riccardo Pick-Mangiagalli (July 10, 1882 – Milan, July 8, 1949) was an Italian composer and pianist of Czech birth.

Life and career
Born in Strakonice, South Bohemia on July 10, 1882, Riccardo Pick-Mangiagalli moved with his family to Milan, Italy when he was two years old. In 1896, at the age of 14, he began his studies at the Milan Conservatory. After graduating from the conservatory in 1903 he worked as a concert pianist for the next 11 years in Italy and in Vienna.

In 1914, Pick-Mangiagalli abandoned in his performance career in favor of pursuing work as a music teacher and composer. He taught on the faculty of the Milan Conservatory, and in 1936 he succeeded Ildebrando Pizzetti as its head. He remained the director of the Milan Conservatory until his death on July 8, 1949, two days before his 67th birthday.

As a composer, Pick-Mangiagalli wrote several operas and ballets, as well as chamber music; he also composed music for films.

References

External links

 

1882 births
1949 deaths
People from Strakonice
Italian classical composers
Italian male classical composers
Italian opera composers
Male opera composers
Italian ballet composers
Milan Conservatory alumni
20th-century classical composers
Academic staff of Milan Conservatory
20th-century Italian composers
20th-century Italian male musicians